Sérgio Filipe Grilo das Neves, known as Sérgio Grilo (born 17 February 1983) is a Portuguese retired football player and coach.

Club career
He made his professional debut in the Segunda Liga for Naval on 10 December 2000 in a game against Marco.

Personal
He is the older brother of Paulo Grilo.

References

1983 births
Living people
People from Figueira da Foz
Portuguese footballers
Portuguese expatriate footballers
Associação Naval 1º de Maio players
S.C. Pombal players
G.D. Sourense players
Liga Portugal 2 players
FC Pampilhosa players
U.D. Oliveirense players
Atromitos Yeroskipou players
Moreirense F.C. players
Othellos Athienou F.C. players
A.D. Nogueirense players
Cypriot Second Division players
Portuguese football managers
Associação Naval 1º de Maio managers
Association football defenders
Association football forwards
Portuguese expatriate sportspeople in Cyprus
Expatriate footballers in Cyprus
Sportspeople from Coimbra District